The following lists events that happened during 1969 in Singapore.

Incumbents
President: Yusuf bin Ishak
Prime Minister: Lee Kuan Yew

Events

March
26 March – The Sentosa Satellite Earth Station is announced, which will take a year to set up.

May
13 May – Ethnic riots break out in Kuala Lumpur, Malaysia, which later spill over to Singapore.
19 May – The Singapore Petroleum Company is formed.

July
1 July – The first SAF Day was commemorated.
18 July - A fifth radio station 92.4FM playing classical music was officially formal full launched. FM Stereo network begins operations was officially introducing stereo broadcast to Singapore. 92.4FM was officially launched. Singapore's first radio station to broadcast in FM Stereo since its launch with 8 hour daily broadcasts from 6:00am to 9:00am and 6:00pm to 11:00pm SST.

December
10 December – Floods hit Singapore after heavy rain, leaving five fatalities.

Births
 10 January – Tan Chuan-Jin, Speaker of the Parliament of Singapore.
 10 February – Poh Lip Meng, national sport shooter (d. 2021).
 14 May – Lim Tong Hai, national football player.
 17 June – James Lye, former actor.
 10 July – Hossan Leong, media personality.
 12 August – Edwin Tong, Minister for Culture, Community and Youth.
 1 September – Lam Pin Min, former politician.
 9 October – Chan Chun Sing, Minister for Education.
 15 November – Ong Ye Kung, Minister for Health.
 Douglas Foo, Founder of Apex-Pal International Ltd (which owns Sakae Sushi), former Nominated Member of Parliament.

References

 
Singapore
Years in Singapore